Thomas Wimmer (Siglfing 7 January 1887 – Munich 18 January 1964) was a Bavarian SPD politician. He was mayor of Munich from 1948 to 1960.

See also 
 Rama dama

References

1887 births
1964 deaths
Social Democratic Party of Germany politicians
Mayors of Munich
Knights Commander of the Order of Merit of the Federal Republic of Germany